The 2004 Speedway Conference League was the third-tier division of British speedway.

Summary
The title was won by Mildenhall Fen Tigers.

Final league table

Conference League Knockout Cup
The 2004 Conference League Knockout Cup was the seventh edition of the Knockout Cup for tier three teams. Mildenhall Fen Tigers were the winners for the second successive year.

Semi-finals

Final

Other Honours
Conference Trophy - Mildenhall Fen Tigers
Conference league pairs - 1st Wimbledon; 2nd Mildenhall
Conference league fours - Mildenhall 16, Newcastle 13, Wimbledon 13, Stoke 6
Conference League Riders' Championship - James Wright (Buxton)

See also
List of United Kingdom Speedway League Champions

References

Conference
Speedway Conference League